Victoria L. Schade (born December 31, 1970) was a Republican member of the Maryland House of Delegates, District 31 in Anne Arundel County.

Background
Delegate Schade was first elected to the Maryland House of Delegates in January 1995 to represent District 31 in Anne Arundel County, which covers the northern part of the county, including Glen Burnie.  She only served 1 term before being  defeated in the 1998 general election by Mary Russo.

Education
Delegate Schade graduated from Chesapeake High School in Pasadena, Maryland.  After high school she attended the University of Maryland, Baltimore County, better known as UMBC, where she graduated cum laude with her bachelor's degrees in political science and economics in 1991.

Career
Delegate Schade had a short-lived career in the Maryland House of Delegates.  The only committee she served on was the Economic Matters Committee.  Prior to being elected she was a collection representative for Baltimore Gas & Electric.

Since getting voted out of the House, she has served as a legislative liaison to the Department of the Environment. She is a former legislative assistant. In 1992, she was the coordinator for District 31 for the Bush/Quayle campaign. She has been a member of the North County Republican Club  and the Republican Professional Women's club since 1992.

Election results
1998 Race for Maryland House of Delegates – District 31
Voters to choose three:
{| class="wikitable"
|-
!Name
!Votes
!Percent
!Outcome
|-
|-
|John R. Leopold, Rep.
|21,632
|  23%
|   Won
|-
|-
|Joan Cadden, Dem.
|19,214
|  20%
|   Won
|-
|-
|Mary Rosso, Dem.
|15,372
|  16%
|   Won
|-
|-
|Victoria L. Schade, Rep.
|15,366
|  16%
|   Lost
|-
|-
|Robert Schaeffer, Rep.
|12,092
|  14%
|   Lost
|-
|-
|Thomas J. Fleckenstein, Dem.
|11,862
|  12%
|   Lost
|-
|}

1994 Race for Maryland House of Delegates – District 31
Voters to choose three:
{| class="wikitable"
|-
!Name
!Votes
!Percent
!Outcome
|-
|-
|John R. Leopold, Rep.
|19,960
|  24%
|   Won
|-
|-
|Joan Cadden, Dem.
|16,492
|  20%
|   Won
|-
|-
|Victoria L. Schade, Rep.
|14,801
|  18%
|   Won
|-
|-
|W. Ray Huff, Dem.
|14,203
|  17%
|   Lost
|-
|-
|C. Stokes Kolodziejski, Dem.
|13,176
|  16%
|   Lost
|-
|-
|Douglas Arnold, Rep.
|3,586
|  4%
|   Lost
|-
|}

References and notes

External links
 http://www.msa.md.gov/msa/mdmanual/06hse/former/html/msa12304.html

1970 births
Living people
Republican Party members of the Maryland House of Delegates
People from Baltimore County, Maryland
People from Pasadena, Maryland
University of Maryland, Baltimore County alumni
Women state legislators in Maryland
21st-century American women